Église Saint-Martin is the parish church of the small commune of Marmoutier, in the Bas-Rhin department of France. The church used to belong to Marmoutier Abbey and to be dedicated to Saint Stephen; it is still known as église (church), or abbatiale (abbey church) Saint-Étienne.

It is classified as a Monument historique by the French Ministry of Culture since 1840, making it a part of the very first list of such heritage buildings, and is a stage on the Romanesque Road of Alsace.

The western facade of Marmoutier's church is famous for its massive but well balanced architecture, while inside, the 1710 pipe organ by Andreas Silbermann (completed in 1746 by his son, Johann Andreas Silbermann, and restored several times since) and the 18th-century choir stalls are among the most notable items on display.

Gallery

References

External links 

L'église abbatiale, un trésor, on the website of the 

Monuments historiques of Bas-Rhin
Churches in Bas-Rhin
Romanesque architecture in France
Gothic architecture in France
Gothic Revival church buildings in France
Roman Catholic churches in France